The RD-856 (GRAU Index 8D69M), also known as the RD-69M, is a four-nozzle liquid-fuel rocket vernier engine, burning N2O4 and UDMH in a gas generator cycle. It was used on the R-36, Tsyklon-2 and Tsyklon-3 second stage as thrust vector control by gimbaling of its nozzle. The engine is distributed through a cylindrical structure that is integrated around the main engine RD-252 module. The structure includes aerodynamic protection for the nozzles. The engine was started by a pyrotechnic ignitor.

The engine was serially produced between 1965 and 1992. It was first launched on December 16, 1965 on an R-36 and its last launch was on January 30, 2009 with the last launch of the Tsyklon-3. The production capability was restarted for the Tsyklon-4 but with the apparent cancellation of the program the engine would still be out of production.

See also
 R-36 - The Soviet ICBM for which the RD-856 was created.
 Tsyklon-2 - A Soviet small rocket that uses the RD-856.
 Tsyklon-3 - A Soviet small rocket that uses the RD-856.
 Tsyklon-4 - A Ukrainian small rocket project that would have used the RD-856.
 Yuzhnoe Design Bureau - The RD-856 designer bureau.

References

External links
 Yuzhnoye Design Bureau English-language home page
 Yuzhmash Home Page

Rocket engines of the Soviet Union
Rocket engines using hypergolic propellant
Rocket engines using the gas-generator cycle
Yuzhnoye rocket engines
Yuzhmash rocket engines
Rocket engines of Ukraine